The 2022 Fight for the Fallen was the fourth annual Fight for the Fallen professional wrestling charity event produced by All Elite Wrestling (AEW). It was a two-part television special that was held on July 27, 2022, at the DCU Center in Worcester, Massachusetts, encompassing the broadcasts of AEW's weekly television programs, Wednesday Night Dynamite and Friday Night Rampage. Dynamite aired live on TBS while Rampage aired on tape delay on July 29 on TNT. The event expanded upon the previous two years, which were only held as a special episode of Dynamite. For the event's charitable cause, it helped support the non-profit marine wildlife organization, Oceana, as the event was taking place during Shark Week, a major cross-promotional event with AEW broadcast partner Warner Bros. Discovery.

Production

Background
Fight for the Fallen is a charity event held annually in July by All Elite Wrestling (AEW) since 2019. The 2022 event was the fourth event in the Fight for the Fallen chronology. For its charitable cause, AEW partnered with Oceana, a non-profit organization dedicated to defending marine life and oceans around the world. The event was held on July 27, 2022, at the DCU Center in Worcester, Massachusetts, and aired as a two-part television special, encompassing the broadcasts of AEW's weekly television programs, Wednesday Night Dynamite and Friday Night Rampage. Dynamite aired live on TBS while Rampage aired on tape delay on July 29 on TNT. This year's event expanded upon the previous two years, which were only held as a special episode of Dynamite.

Storylines
Fight for the Fallen featured professional wrestling matches that involved different wrestlers from pre-existing scripted feuds and storylines. Wrestlers portrayed heroes, villains, or less distinguishable characters in scripted events that build tension and culminate in a wrestling match or series of matches. Storylines were produced on AEW's weekly television programs, Dynamite and Rampage, the supplementary online streaming shows, Dark and Elevation, and The Young Bucks' YouTube series Being The Elite.

Results

See also
2022 in professional wrestling

References

External links

2022
2020s American television specials
2022 American television episodes
2022 in professional wrestling
2022 in Massachusetts
Events in Worcester, Massachusetts
Events in Massachusetts
July 2022 events in the United States
Professional wrestling in Massachusetts